VPAT may refer to:

 Variable Pitch, Angle and Tilt, a blade for the Caterpillar D6
 Vacaville Performing Arts Theatre, Vacaville, California
 Veterans Peace Action Teams
 Veterinary Practitioners' Association of Thailand
 Voluntary Partnership Assistance Team, Kentucky education
 Voluntary Product Accessibility Template, part of the United States Section 508 Amendment to the Rehabilitation Act of 1973